Günther Tuchel is a West German retired slalom canoeist who competed in the mid-1960s. He won two medals in the C-2 team event at the ICF Canoe Slalom World Championships with a silver in 1963 and a bronze in 1965.

References

German male canoeists
Possibly living people
Year of birth missing (living people)
Medalists at the ICF Canoe Slalom World Championships